Utkarsh Ambudkar (born December 8, 1983), also known by his stage name UTK the INC, is an American actor, rapper, and singer. He is known for his film roles including Pitch Perfect (2012), Game Over, Man! (2018), Blindspotting (2018), Brittany Runs a Marathon (2019), The Broken Hearts Gallery (2020), Free Guy (2021), and Tick, Tick... Boom! (2021). His television roles include The Mindy Project, White Famous, Never Have I Ever, and Ghosts. He recently appeared in the Hulu limited series The Dropout (2022).

He made his Broadway debut in Lin-Manuel Miranda's improvisational hip-hop show Freestyle Love Supreme in 2019.

Early life
Ambudkar was born in Baltimore, Maryland. He grew up in the suburbs where his parents, who had emigrated from India in the 1980s, were research scientists at the National Institutes of Health. He starred in comedy roles at Thomas S. Wootton High School in Rockville, Maryland, and he earned a Bachelor of Fine Arts degree from the Tisch School of the Arts at New York University in 2004.

Through his mother, Ambudkar is a descendant of the lawyer and jurist Sir Vembakkam Bhashyam Aiyangar.

Career
Ambudkar is a former VJ for MTV Desi. He appeared in the comedy film Pitch Perfect as the character Donald, and in the television shows The Mindy Project and The Muppets. He was set to star in the Fox series Eat, Pray, Thug but the show was not picked up. Ambudkar originated the role of Aaron Burr in the developmental readings of Hamilton. He was seen in the Dungeons & Dragons campaign Force Grey: Giant Hunters and Force Grey: Lost City of Omu, hosted by Matthew Mercer. In that, he played the character "Hitch", a rogue with a nefarious past. He formerly played Raj on the sitcom Brockmire.

He was a member of the musical group "The Beatards." Utkarsh has appeared in several Youtube sketch comedy skits including the comedy groups CollegeHumor and Key & Peele.

Since 2005, Ambudkar has been a part of hip-hop improv group Freestyle Love Supreme under the name UTK the INC. As part of the group, he participated in the limited television series for Pivot in 2014 and made his Broadway debut in the group's self-titled show on October 2, 2019. He played Jern in the 2019 film Brittany Runs a Marathon.

He played Skatch, a con artist, in a deleted scene of the 2020 Disney live-action remake of Mulan. That same year he appeared in Disney's Godmothered, and then in the 2021 action comedy Free Guy. In 2020, Ambudkar debuted as the mongoose Chikku in the Disney Junior animated series Mira, Royal Detective. He is currently starring in the CBS supernatural sitcom Ghosts (2021).

Personal life
Ambudkar married in 2019, and has two children.

Discography
The Gold Tusk EP (2006)
Members Only EP (2012)
Vanity (2019) 
Petty (2019)

Filmography

Film

Television

Theatre

References

External links
 
 
 

Living people
1983 births
21st-century American male actors
American male actors of Indian descent
Marathi people
American people of Indian Tamil descent
American male film actors
American male stage actors
American male television actors
American male voice actors
Male actors from Baltimore
Tisch School of the Arts alumni
American rappers